The 1962–63 Divizia A was the forty-fifth season of Divizia A, the top-level football league of Romania.

Teams

League table

Results

Top goalscorers

Champion squad

See also 

 1962–63 Divizia B

References

Liga I seasons
Romania
1962–63 in Romanian football